Harpalus servus is a species of ground beetle native to Europe, where it can be found in such territories as Austria, Baltic states (except for Estonia), Benelux, Belarus, Bulgaria, Czech Republic, Denmark, Great Britain including the Isle of Man, Hungary, Italy, Moldova, Poland, Romania, Slovakia, Slovenia, Sweden, Ukraine and both southern and central  parts of Russia. Its presence in Spain and Switzerland is considered to be doubtful. It is also found in Kazakhstan.

References

servus
Beetles of Asia
Beetles of Europe
Beetles described in 1812